William Correa (February 28, 1934 – September 15, 1983), better known by his stage name Willie Bobo, was an American Latin jazz percussionist of Puerto Rican descent. Bobo rejected the stereotypical expectations of Latino music and was noted for combining elements of jazz, Latin and rhythm and blues music.

Early life
Born William Correa to a Puerto Rican family, Bobo grew up in Spanish Harlem, New York City, United States. His father played the cuatro, a ten stringed guitar-like instrument. As a teenager, Bobo taught himself the bongos and later the congas, timbales and drums. In 1947, Bobo started working as a band boy for Machito in order to gain entrance to the band's concerts, sometimes filling in on percussion.

At age 12, he began his professional career as a dancer and two years later made his recording debut as a bongo player.

Career 
He met Mongo Santamaría shortly after his arrival in New York and studied with him while acting as his translator. In the early 1950s, Bobo recorded with Mary Lou Williams. She is said to have first given the nickname "Bobo" which means life-of-the-party in Spanish.

From 1954 until 1957, Bobo played with Tito Puente's band as part of the percussion section alongside Santamaria. Bobo joined George Shearing's band on the album The Shearing Spell.

After leaving Shearing, Cal Tjader asked Bobo and Santamaría to become part of the Cal Tjader Modern Mambo Quintet, who released several albums as the mambo craze reached fever pitch in the late 1950s. Reuniting with his mentor Santamaría in 1960, the pair released the album Sabroso! for the Fantasy label. Bobo later formed his own group, releasing Do That Thing/Guajira with Tico and Bobo's Beat and Let's Go Bobo for Roulette, without achieving huge penetration.

After the success of Tjader's Soul Sauce, in which he was heavily involved, Bobo formed a new band with the backing of Verve Records, releasing Spanish Grease, the title track being perhaps his most well known tune. Highly successful at this attempt, Bobo released a further six albums with Verve.

In 1969, he moved to Los Angeles. He again met up with his longtime friend Richard Sanchez Sr. and his son Richard Jr. and began recording in the studio. Bobo then worked as a session musician for Carlos Santana among others, as well as being a regular in the band for Bill Cosby's variety show Cos. Santana covered Willie Bobo's Latin song "Evil Ways" in 1969 on their debut album. In the late 1970s, Bobo recorded albums for Blue Note and Columbia Records.

Personal life 
Bobo's youngest son, Eric Bobo (Eric Correa), is a percussionist with crew Cypress Hill. He also performed on the Beastie Boys' 1994 album Ill Communication,. His grandson, William Valen Correa, is co-founder of the music-based non-profit organization HNDP Los Angeles.

After a period of ill health, Bobo died at the age of 49, succumbing to cancer.

Discography

As leader
 Do That Thing/Guajira (Tico, 1963)
 Bobo's Beat (Roulette, 1964)
 Let's Go Bobo! (Roulette, 1964)
 Spanish Grease (Verve, 1965)
 Uno Dos Tres 1•2•3 (Verve, 1966)
 Feelin' So Good (Verve, 1966)
 Juicy (Verve, 1967)
 Bobo Motion (Verve, 1967)
 Spanish Blues Band (Verve, 1968)
 A New Dimension (Verve, 1969)
 Do What You Want to Do (Sussex, 1971)
 The Drum Session (Philips Records, 1975) with Louie Bellson, Shelly Manne & Paul Humphrey
 Tomorrow Is Here (Blue Note, 1977)
 Hell Of An Act To Follow (Columbia, 1978)
 Bobo (Columbia, 1979)
 Lost & Found (Concord Picante, 2006)
 Dig My Feeling (Nacional Records 2016)

As sideman
With Nat Adderley
Autobiography (Atlantic, 1965)
With Dorothy Ashby
The Fantastic Jazz Harp of Dorothy Ashby (Atlantic, 1965)
With Bob Brookmeyer
Trombone Jazz Samba (Verve, 1962)
With Eddie "Lockjaw" Davis
Goin' to the Meeting (Prestige, 1962)
With Miles Davis
Quiet Nights (Columbia, 1964)
Sorcerer (Columbia, 1967)
With Victor Feldman
Latinsville! (Contemporary, 1960)
With José Feliciano
Angela (Private Stock, 1976)
With Benny Golson
Killer Joe (Columbia, 1977)
With Dexter Gordon
Landslide (Blue Note, 1962 [1980])
With Grant Green
The Latin Bit (Blue Note, 1962)
With Chico Hamilton
Chic Chic Chico (Impulse!, 1965)
El Chico (Impulse!, 1965)
The Further Adventures of El Chico (Impulse!, 1966)
With Slide Hampton
Explosion! The Sound of Slide Hampton (Atlantic, 1962)
With Herbie Hancock
Inventions and Dimensions (Blue Note, 1964)
With Eddie Harris
Bad Luck Is All I Have (Atlantic, 1975)
With Bobby Hutcherson
Montara (Blue Note, 1975) 
With Herbie Mann
Right Now (Atlantic, 1962)
Brazil, Bossa Nova & Blues (United Artists, 1962) 
Herbie Mann Live at Newport (Atlantic, 1963)
My Kinda Groove (Atlantic, 1965)
Latin Mann (Columbia, 1965)
Our Mann Flute (Atlantic, 1966)
The Beat Goes On (Atlantic, 1967)
With Les McCann
McCanna (Pacific Jazz, 1964)
Much Les (Atlantic, 1968)
With Gary McFarland
Soft Samba (Verve, 1963)
With Buddy Miles
Chapter VII (Columbia, 1973)
With Wes Montgomery
Movin' Wes (Verve, 1964)
With Oliver Nelson
Skull Session (Flying Dutchman, 1975)
With Dave Pike
Limbo Carnival (New Jazz, 1962)
Manhattan Latin (Decca, 1964)
With Tito Puente
Cuban Carnival (RCA Victor, 1956)
With Ike Quebec
Soul Samba (Blue Note, 1962)
With Terry Reid
River (Atlantic, 1973)
With Dannie Richmond
"In" Jazz for the Culture Set (Impulse!, 1965)
With Charlie Rouse
Bossa Nova Bacchanal (Blue Note, 1963)
With A. K. Salim
Afro-Soul/Drum Orgy (Prestige, 1965)
With Mongo Santamaria
Mighty Mongo (Fantasy, 1962)
Viva Mongo! (Fantasy, 1962)
With Doc Severinsen
Rhapsody For Now! (RCA, 1973)
With Sonny Stitt
Stitt Goes Latin (Roost, 1963)
With Gábor Szabó
Spellbinder (Impulse!, 1966)
With Clark Terry
Mumbles (Mainstream, 1966)
With Cal Tjader
Latino (Fantasy, 1958)
Cal Tjader's Concert by the Sea (Fantasy, 1959)
Cal Tjader's Latin Concert (Fantasy, 1959)
West Side Story (Fantasy, 1960)
Plays Harold Arlen (Fantasy, 1961) 
Live and Direct (Fantasy, 1962)
Breeze from the East (Verve, 1964)
Soul Sauce (Verve, 1965)
With Don Wilkerson
Elder Don (Blue Note, 1962)

Filmography
2008 Willie Bobo: King Conga

References

External links
 Eric Bobo video interview

1934 births
1983 deaths
Afro-Cuban jazz percussionists
American jazz percussionists
Artists from New York (state)
Latin jazz musicians
Jazz percussionists
Blue Note Records artists
Burials at Forest Lawn Memorial Park (Hollywood Hills)
American people of Puerto Rican descent
Bongo players
Timbaleros
20th-century American drummers
American male drummers
20th-century American male musicians
American male jazz musicians
People from East Harlem
Jazz musicians from New York (state)